Ardo Ärmpalu (born 26 December 1980) is an Estonian basketball player.

He was born in Rapla. In 2004 he graduated from Marshall University, USA.

He began his basketball career at the age of 11. He has played Kalev/Cramo club (1998 and 2006 Estonian champion). 2001–2005 he was a member of Estonia men's national basketball team.

References

Living people
1980 births
Estonian men's basketball players
BC Kalev/Cramo players
Marshall University alumni
People from Rapla